Ivan Deveson AO (born 18 February 1934) is an Australian businessman and the 100th Lord Mayor of Melbourne from 1996 to 1999 after a period of Commissioners controlling the Melbourne City Council.  Deveson was elected for 3 consecutive terms, the only time in Melbourne's history that this has occurred.  This was the result of the State Government's Local Government reforms. Deveson was responsible for maintaining the debt free status of Melbourne City Council.

In 1991 Ivan Deveson was Victorian of the Year and made an Officer of the Order of Australia (AO). Ivan is a member of the Patrons Council of the Epilepsy Foundation of Victoria.

In June 2002, Ivan was awarded an Honorary Doctorate in Management from Kettering University (USA) and in May 2003 received an Honorary Doctorate from the Australian Catholic University for his contribution to ethics in business. In March 2004, Mr Deveson was invited by the Pontifical Council to participate in a conference in Rome on Business Ethics.

He has written a book "The Evolution of an Australian Management Style".

References

Melbourne City Council
Australian Rulers

1934 births
Living people
Businesspeople from Melbourne
Mayors and Lord Mayors of Melbourne
Chancellors of RMIT University
Officers of the Order of Australia